The Catalpa Farm is a historic home and farm complex located at Princess Anne, Somerset County, Maryland, United States. It is a two-story, five-bay center passage structure built in two principal stages. The older section is a two-story, three-bay side-hall parlor house with service wing erected around 1825–1840. A two-story one-room plan frame addition was attached shortly thereafter. Also on the property are an early 19th-century dairy and smokehouse, a late 19th-century privy, a modern garage, a mid-19th-century corn crib, an early 20th-century gambrel-roofed barn, and an early 19th-century tobacco house.

The Catalpa Farm was listed on the National Register of Historic Places in 1988.

References

External links
, including photo from 1985, at Maryland Historical Trust

Houses in Somerset County, Maryland
Farms on the National Register of Historic Places in Maryland
National Register of Historic Places in Somerset County, Maryland